Amor y orgullo (English title:Love and Pride) is a Mexican telenovela produced by Ernesto Alonso and transmitted by Telesistema Mexicano.

María Elena Marqués and Ignacio López Tarso starred as protagonists, Patricia Morán starred as main antagonist.

Cast 
María Elena Marqués as Marcela
Ignacio López Tarso as Jaime López
Patricia Morán as Ruth
Anita Blanch as Edelmira
Miguel Manzano as Joaquin
Aarón Hernán as Padre Juan
Emma Roldán as Teo
Hortensia Santoveña
Rogelio Guerra as Armando
Patricia de Morelos
Regina Cardo

References

External links

Mexican telenovelas
1966 telenovelas
Televisa telenovelas
Spanish-language telenovelas
1966 Mexican television series debuts
1966 Mexican television series endings